The Bombyx second hybrid is a cross between a male Bombyx mori moth and a female Bombyx mandarina moth. Since the male Bombyx mori (domestic silkmoth) does not fly, it is completely dependent on humans to reproduce. They produce larvae called silkworms, like all species in Bombyx, except they are brownish in the first half and grayish at the bottom half. They produce silk and give out black droppings.

The domestic silkmoth (B. mori) was domesticated from the wild silkmoth (B. mandarina) more than 5,000 years ago.

Bombycidae
Hybrid animals